Tanya Lopert (born 19 June 1942 in New York City) is a French actress and the daughter of Ilya Lopert. She appeared in more than seventy films since 1961.

Selected filmography

External links 
 

French film actresses
1942 births
Living people